FC Juventus Bucuresti  can refer to two Romanian football teams.

 Petrolul Ploiesti – Was named Juventus București during 1924–1947
  SC Juventus Bucureşti – Juventus București to 1992